George Nicolas "Nick" Georgano (29 February 1932 – 22 October 2017) was a British author, specialising in motoring history. His most notable work is The Complete Encyclopedia of Motorcars, first published in 1968.

Early life and education
Georgano was born in London in 1932. At age 7 he was compiling a truck catalogue, and at age 16, an encyclopaedia. He went to Bryanston School and then graduated from the New College, Oxford with a diploma in teaching.

Career
After college, he took up a career in teaching, his first position being at an English preparatory school.

He was a teacher at Trent college in Long Eaton Notts.

Georgano's first full publication was The World's Automobiles which he co-authored with Ralph Doyle (George Ralph Doyle 1890–1961). This was followed by The Complete Encyclopedia of Motorcars which was published in 1968.

From 1976 to 1981 Georgano worked at the National Motor Museum as Head Librarian.

Death 
On 22 October 2017, Georgano died on the birthday of one of his grandsons, Harry Northmore.

Awards
Georgano was awarded the Thomas McKean Memorial Cup of the Antique Automobile Club of America.

He was presented with the Veteran and Vintage Magazine Trophy by Edward Douglas-Scott-Montagu, 3rd Baron Montagu of Beaulieu for The Complete Encyclopedia of Motorcars.

He received the Montagu Trophy of the Guild of Motoring Writers for two of his works: Britain's Motor Industry: The First 100 Years and The Complete Encyclopedia of Motorcars.

Georgano was a Trustee of the Michael Sedgwick Memorial Trust; a member of the National Motor Museum Advisory Council; and Trustee of the Horseless Carriage Foundation, California.

Publications
Georgano is the author of 33 reference books.

References

1932 births
British motoring journalists
20th-century English historians
English motorsport people
Automotive historians
Motorcycling writers
2017 deaths
21st-century English historians
20th-century English male writers
21st-century English male writers
British male non-fiction writers
Writers from London
Alumni of the University of Oxford